Boży Dar transmitter is a broadcasting facility near Bozy Dar near Lublin, Poland. Built in 1962, it transmits from a 210 metres tall guyed mast located at 

It broadcasts the FM-radio program Radio Zet on 107 MHz with 120 kW ERP. The antenna used for FM-broadcasting is 182 metres, that for TV broadcasting 206 metres above ground.
Boży Dar transmitter has a second mast with a height of 105 metres.

It was erected in 1961 and used for broadcasting the second program of Polskie Radio on 1206 kHz (before 23 November 1978 on 1367 kHz) with 60 kW ERP until 1 February 1998. The current use of the mast is unknown.

References

External links
 Radiopolska catalog of antennas, retrieved on 2008-05-20.
 Radiopolska catalog of AM stations, retrieved on 2008-05-20.

Radio masts and towers in Poland
Buildings and structures in Lublin
Towers completed in 1962
1962 establishments in Poland